Zonateres lanei is a species of snake of the family Colubridae. The species is found in Brazil, Paraguay, and Bolivia.

References

Colubrids
Reptiles of Bolivia
Reptiles of Brazil
Reptiles of Paraguay
Reptiles described in 2005